Dendrocincla is a genus of bird in the woodcreeper subfamily (Dendrocolaptinae).

Taxonomy and systematics

Extant species
The genus contains six species:

Former species
Formerly, some authorities also considered the following species (or subspecies) as species within the genus Dendrocincla:
 Sangihe whistler (as Dendrocincla macrorhyncha)

References

External links

 
Bird genera
Taxa named by George Robert Gray
Taxonomy articles created by Polbot